Bowring is an unincorporated community and Census Designated Place in Osage County, Oklahoma, United States. The post office was established November 12, 1923. It is said to have been named from the combination of the names of two local ranchers, Mart Bowhan and Richard Woodring.

Geography
Bowring is served by Oklahoma State Highway 10 (SH-10), which runs from the nearby town of Copan from the east and the unincorporated hamlet of Herd to the west.

Demographics

Nearby communities

Whippoorwill Point (east of Bowring on SH-10)
Hulah (this is largely a ghost town east of Bowring on SH-10)
Herd (this is largely a ghost town west of Bowring on SH-10)

Railroad history
Bowring was once served by the Atchison, Topeka & Santa Fe Railroad (AT&SF). Cattle ranchers once drove their cattle to the west side of town to be loaded onto cattle cars to be taken to markets throughout the area. The AT&SF Railroad into Bowring began in Owen Township south of nearby Caney, Kansas, in northern Washington County, through what was Hulah, east of Bowring, then south across the Caney River, then on the south side of Whippoorwill Point, through Bowring and further west into Pawhuska.

The old Hulah Depot that sat near SH-10 has since been moved to Johnstone Park in the nearby city of Bartlesville.

Recreation and fishing
Bowring has two lakes nearby on SH-10: Copan Lake and Dam, west of the town of Copan on the Little Caney River, and Hulah Lake and Dam on the Caney River near the unincorporated hamlet of Whippoorwill Point. Both lakes and dams are in the United States Army Corps of Engineers Tulsa District. The lakes and dams provide flood control protection for the nearby cities of Dewey and Bartlesville. The Caney River has its confluence with the Verdigris River to the northeast of the city of Claremore and is a part of the greater Arkansas River watershed. Both the Little Caney and Caney rivers have their sources in central Kansas.

Climate

References

Sources
Shirk, George H. Oklahoma Place Names. Norman: University of Oklahoma Press, 1987.  .

Unincorporated communities in Osage County, Oklahoma
Unincorporated communities in Oklahoma